Diplommatina lateralis is a species of land snails with an operculum, terrestrial gastropod mollusks in the family Diplommatinidae.

This species is endemic to Japan.

References

Molluscs of Japan
Endemic fauna of Japan
Diplommatina
Gastropods described in 1904
Taxonomy articles created by Polbot